FC Yugra Nizhnevartovsk was a Russian football team from Nizhnevartovsk. It played professionally from 1994 to 1999. Their best result was 2nd place in Zone East of the Russian Second Division in 1997.

Team name history
 1994–1999 FC Samotlor-XXI Nizhnevartovsk
 2002–2004 FC Yugra Nizhnevartovsk

External links
  Team history at KLISF

Association football clubs established in 1994
Association football clubs disestablished in 2005
Defunct football clubs in Russia
Sport in Khanty-Mansi Autonomous Okrug
1994 establishments in Russia
2005 disestablishments in Russia